The Landévennec Group is a group of 10th and 11th century illuminated manuscripts of the Four Evangelists from Basse-Bretagne, probably all from the scriptorium of Landévennec Abbey. Influenced by insular art, they are marked by their representation of the evangelists as humans with animal heads.

List
 British Library, Breton Gospel Book (British Library, MS Egerton 609): provenance from Marmoutier Abbey, Tours, entered the British Museum in 1836
 Bern, Burgerbibliothek, MS 85: dating to 850-900, once belonged to Fleury Abbey
 Boulogne-sur-Mer, Bibliothèque municipale, MS 8: dating to 850-900, brought by monks fleeing from Landévennec after its destruction by the Vikings in 913, who settled in Montreuil-sur-Mer
 Troyes, Médiathèque, MS 960: dating to 909, Gospels, known as the Saint-Gildas-de-Ruys Gospels
 Oxford, Bodleian Library, Auct. D. 2. 16: dating to 900-950, given to Exeter Cathedral by bishop Leofric.
 New York Public Library, Harkness Gospels, MS 115: dating to 890-910, named after its former owner, who donated his book collection to the New York Public Library in 1928, with two other more classical Romanesque miniatures added in the 11th century.

References

Sources
Evangéliaires carolingiens de Bretagne
René Crozet, Les représentations anthropo-zoomorphiques des évangélistes dans l'enluminure et dans la peinture murale aux époques carolingienne et romane, vol. 1e année, avril-juin 1958, pages 182-187, chap. n° 2
Jonathan J. C. Alexander, « La résistance à la domination culturelle carolingienne dans l'art breton du IXe siècle: le témoignage de l'enluminure des manuscrits », dans Landévennec et le monachisme breton du haut Moyen Âge, Actes du colloque du XVe centenaire de l'abbaye, 1985, p. 269-280
Louis Lemoine, « Le Scriptorium de Landévennec et les représentations de saint Marc », dans Mélanges François Kerlouégan, Presses universitaires de Franche-Comté, 1994, p. 363-380

10th-century illuminated manuscripts
11th-century illuminated manuscripts
Egerton collection
Bodleian Library collection
Manuscripts in the New York Public Library